First Abu Dhabi Bank (FAB) is the largest bank in the United Arab Emirates. It was formed following a merger between First Gulf Bank (FGB) and National Bank of Abu Dhabi (NBAD).

FAB offers financial solutions, products and services through its Corporate and Investment Banking and Personal Banking franchises.

Headquartered in Abu Dhabi in Khalifa Business Park, the bank has a presence in five continents: Asia Pacific (APAC), Europe, Americas, Middle East and Africa (EAMEA).

History
First Abu Dhabi Bank was formed as a result of a merger between FGB and NBAD. On 3 July 2016, the two UAE banks announced that their boards of directors had voted unanimously on the recommendation to shareholders for the merger of the two entities. The transaction was approved by the respective shareholders on 7 December 2016. The transaction was executed through a share swap, with FGB shareholders receiving 1.254 NBAD shares for each FGB share they held. The merger led to the creation of the UAE’s largest bank, First Abu Dhabi Bank (FAB) in April 2017.

The launch of FAB’s new brand identity combined the ‘Abu Dhabi’ and ‘First’ identities from NBAD and FGB, the First Abu Dhabi Bank (FAB) name reflects the two banks’ roots in the region. The bank adopted the acronym F.A.B in its logo, which also features the “Awwal” (First) brand mark, enlarged to represent growth and leadership.

In 2019, the bank began international expansion with the start of operations in Saudi Arabia.

The Bank's net profit declined from AED 12.5 billion in 2019 to AED 10.6 billion in 2020.

In January 2021, Hana Al Rostamani has been appointed as group chief executive officer. Company said its net profits were US$3.4 billion in the end of 2021, 19 percent up from than previous year.

Recognitions
FAB has been ranked by Global Finance as the safest bank in the UAE and the Middle East and the best bank in the UAE.

The Banker’s Top 1000 World Banks 2020 list, measured by Tier 1 capital, ranked FAB as number one in the UAE, second in the Middle East and 85th across the globe – in addition to ranking the bank #109 by assets in the same list.

FAB was also ranked first in the UAE, 4th in the Arab world and 303rd globally in Forbes annual ranking of the world’s 2000 largest public companies.

Financial performance 
For the year 2022, First Abu Dhabi Bank has posted a net profit of AED 13.4 billion.

References

Banks established in 2017
Emirati companies established in 2017
Banks of the United Arab Emirates
Companies based in Abu Dhabi